Ras El Ain Chaouia is a rural commune in Settat Province of the Casablanca-Settat region of Morocco, centered on the town of Ras El Ain. At the time of the 2004 census, the commune had a total population of 15,607 people living in 2603 households.

References

Populated places in Settat Province
Rural communes of Casablanca-Settat